Urpo is a given name. Notable people with the name include:

Urpo Korhonen (1923–2009), Finnish cross-country skier
Urpo Lahtinen, Finnish magazine publisher
Urpo Pikkupeura (born 1957), former ice speed skater from Finland
Urpo Sivula (born 1988), Finnish professional volleyball player
Urpo Ylönen (born 1943), goaltending coach and a retired professional ice hockey player who played in the SM-liiga

See also
The Urpo Ylönen trophy is an ice hockey award given by the Finnish SM-liiga to the best goalie of the season

Finnish masculine given names